The Obeah Stakes is an American Thoroughbred horse race run annually in mid June at Delaware Park Racetrack in Stanton, Delaware. Formerly a Grade III event open to horses age three and older, it is contested on dirt at a distance of a mile and an eighth (9 furlongs).

The race is named in honor of Jane du Pont Lunger's filly, Obeah, winner of the Delaware Handicap in 1969 and 1970.

Historical notes
After a nine-month layoff, the filly Unbridled Belle ran second in the 2007 Obeah, won the 2008 edition by nearly six lengths and at age six, won the 2009 race by eleven lengths.

Records 
 
Speed record: 
  miles - 1:48.05 - Fleet Indian  (2006) 

Most wins by a jockey:
 3 - Ramon Dominguez    (2002, 2005 & 2008)

Most wins by a trainer:
 3 - Todd Pletcher    (2005, 2008 & 2009)

Winners

References
 The 2009 Obeah Stakes at the NTRA

Graded stakes races in the United States
Horse races in Delaware
Mile category horse races for fillies and mares
Recurring sporting events established in 1984
Delaware Park Racetrack
1984 establishments in Delaware